The Bank of Italy Building is a 14-story,  Renaissance Revival high-rise built in 1925 in downtown San Jose, California. This building became the second home to the first branch of the Bank of Italy, founded in San Francisco in 1904, which later became the Bank of America. The first location of the Bank of Italy in San Jose, was on the corner of Santa Clara St. and Lightson Alley, near the intersection with Market Street. Restaurants and other businesses occupy the original building, which has been heavily remodeled. A reconstruction of the original building is at History Park in San Jose.

History
The Bank of Italy Building is one of the oldest skyscrapers in the Silicon Valley, and was designed by architect Henry A. Minton. From when it was built in 1926 until 1970, it was the tallest building between San Francisco and Los Angeles.  It is a Mediterranean Revival—Beaux-Arts architecture style structure, with a red-tile hip roof and a decorative cupola with a needle-like spire featuring a tall green light.

Present
The building is a designated San Jose Historical Landmark, and in a National Register of Historic Places—Historic District. It is currently used for office space for various law firms and tax services among others, in addition to a pawn shop and a night club, and formerly an AIDS advocacy group. The building was sold to local developers and real estate investors Gary Dillabough and Jeff Arrillaga for $27.04 million in December 2017.

See also
Bank of America History
National Register of Historic Places listings in Santa Clara County, California

References

External links

 NRHP Historic District Contributing Buildings - Old Bank of America Building

History of Santa Clara County, California
Beaux-Arts architecture in California
Mediterranean Revival architecture in California
Historic districts on the National Register of Historic Places in California
National Register of Historic Places in Santa Clara County, California
Skyscraper office buildings in San Jose, California